Nemacheilus longistriatus is a species of ray-finned fish in the genus Nemacheilus.It is found in the middle Mekong basin from Chiang Rai to Cambodia and Laos, in Cambodia it occurs in Tonle Sap.

Footnotes 

 

L
Fish described in 1990